Correia Pinto is a municipality in the state of Santa Catarina in the South region of Brazil. It was created in 1982 out of the existing municipality of Lages.

The city is served by Planalto Serrano Regional Airport.

See also
List of municipalities in Santa Catarina

References

Municipalities in Santa Catarina (state)